Three Smart Girls is a 1936 American musical comedy film directed by Henry Koster and starring Barbara Read, Nan Grey, Deanna Durbin (her feature film debut), and Ray Milland. The film's screenplay was written by Adele Comandini and Austin Parker, and is about three sisters who travel to New York City to prevent their father from remarrying. The three plot to bring their divorced parents back together again.

It began an eight-year span of successful Deanna Durbin musicals and spawned two sequels, Three Smart Girls Grow Up and Hers to Hold.

Plot
Three sisters living in Switzerland hear their father is going to marry a younger woman in New York. They travel there to stop it.

Their plan involves getting a man to seduce her father's fiancée. They accidentally hire a genuinely rich man who falls for one of the sisters.

Cast
 Binnie Barnes as Donna Lyons
 Charles Winninger as Judson Craig
 Alice Brady as Mrs. Lyons
 Ray Milland as Lord Michael Stuart
 Mischa Auer as Count Arisztid
 Ernest Cossart as Binns
 Lucile Watson as Martha 
 John 'Dusty' King as Bill Evans (as John King)
 Nella Walker as Dorothy Craig
 Hobart Cavanaugh as Wilbur Lamb
 Nan Grey as Joan 
 Barbara Read as Kay 
 Deanna Durbin as 'Penny'

Production
The film was based on an original story. It was purchased for Universal by Adele Comandini. This film became a vehicle for 13 year old Jeanne Dante, who had been on Broadway in Call It a Day. The film was produced by Harry John Brown who had recently joined Universal from Warners.

Joe Pasternak wanted Judy Garland for Durbin's role, but Garland's home studio, MGM, wouldn't loan her out for the picture. However, Joe would produce four Garland films when he moved to MGM. Durbin was picked up from MGM after a short film, Every Sunday co-starring Garland. MGM dropped Durbin's contract freeing her to do Three Smart Girls.

In July 1936, Deanna Durbin appeared alongside Dante, with Henry Koster to direct. By August Dante had dropped out and the three girls were to be played by Durbin, Nan Grey and Barbara Read. Binnie Barnes signed to play the vamp.

Ray Milland was a last-minute replacement for Louis Hayward, who was originally cast, but fell ill shortly of pleurisy four days into filming. The replacement was made in September.

Reception
The film was a huge box office hit. Writing for The Spectator in 1937, Graham Greene gave the film a mixed review, complaining about the sentimentality of the first half of the film, and noting that it is only with the appearance of Precious, her mother, the Hungarian Count, and the English nobleman in the second half of the film that the picture is made. While criticizing Durbin's "consciously girlish" performance, Greene praised the acting of Auer and claimed that the second half of the film was where "some welcome humour of an adult kind creep[s] tardily" into the film.

Awards
Three Smart Girls received Academy Award nominations for Best Picture, Best Sound (Homer G. Tasker), and Best Original Story.

Legacy
The film not only made Deanna Durbin a star, but it led to a number of imitations.

References

External links
 
 
 
 
 

1936 films
1936 musical comedy films
1936 romantic comedy films
American musical comedy films
American romantic comedy films
American romantic musical films
American black-and-white films
1930s English-language films
American films based on plays
Films directed by Henry Koster
Films set in New York City
Universal Pictures films
Films produced by Joe Pasternak
1930s romantic musical films
1936 directorial debut films
1930s American films